Tunisia is divided into 24 governorates.

The governorates are divided into 264 "delegations" or "districts" (mutamadiyat), and further subdivided into municipalities (shaykhats) and sectors (imadats).

References

 
Tunisia
Tunisia